The Monégasque ambassador in Beijing is the official representative of the Government in Monaco City to the Government of the People's Republic of China.

List of representatives

References 

 
Lists of ambassadors of Monaco
Monaco